The Akwa Ibom State Ministry of Works is the state government ministry charged with the responsibility of planning, devising, and implementing state policies on public works.

References 

Government ministries of Akwa Ibom State